Serhiy Kuznetsov (born on 31 August 1982) is a Ukrainian football coach and a former player who played as a forward and is a manager of Hungarian club Diósgyőr. He is a son of another footballer Serhiy Kuznetsov. He was registered with the Russian league as a Hungarian citizen.

Playing career
Kuznetsov began his footballing career in the Hungarian club Ferencváros, the club his father, also Serhiy Kuznetsov, joined in 1991 from Chornomorets. Serhiy Kuznetsov, a highly athletic striker, was noticed by the Professional Finnish side Jokerit in 2000, in which club Kuznetsov began his professional career. When playing in the Lithuanian premier league club FK Vėtra, Kuznetsov became the top scorer in the Lithuanian League, netting 19 goals in 42 appearances. In Nosta, Kuznetsov became the second highest scorer for the club in 2007. After the start of the 2008–09 season in the Ukrainian Premier League, Kuznetsov signed a 2.5-year contract with the Ukrainian Premier League side FC Karpaty Lviv.

Kuznetsov has also played for the Ukrainian national youth football team.

Coaching career
Kuznetsov started his coaching career as an assistant to Oleg Kononov (who coached Kuznetsov previously for Sheriff, Karpaty and Sevastopol) in Russian clubs FC Arsenal Tula and FC Spartak Moscow. On 29 September 2019, following Kononov's resignation as Spartak manager, he was appointed caretaker manager for Spartak. He left Spartak after permanent manager Domenico Tedesco was appointed on 14 October 2019.

On 24 August 2022, he was appointed as the manager of Nemzeti Bajnokság II club Diósgyőri VTK.

Personal life
He is the son of footballer Serhiy Kuznetsov who in 1983 represented Ukraine at the Spartakiad of the Peoples of the USSR.

Honors
 Veikkausliiga: runner-up 2000
 Hungarian National Championship I: 2003; third place 2001, 2002
 Hungarian Cup: 2003
 Belarusian Premier League: 2003
 Moldovan Premier League: 2004
 A Lyga third place: 2006

Individual
 A Lyga top scorer: 2006
 Nosta second top scorer: 2007

External links
 Profile on the ua-football

References

1982 births
Living people
Footballers from Kharkiv
Ukrainian people of Russian descent
Ukrainian footballers
Association football forwards
Ukrainian expatriate footballers
Expatriate footballers in Hungary
Expatriate footballers in Finland
Expatriate footballers in Romania
Expatriate footballers in Belarus
Expatriate footballers in Moldova
Expatriate footballers in Lithuania
Expatriate footballers in Russia
Ukrainian Premier League players
Russian Premier League players
Ukrainian expatriate sportspeople in Hungary
Ukrainian expatriate sportspeople in Finland
Ukrainian expatriate sportspeople in Belarus
Ukrainian expatriate sportspeople in Moldova
Ukrainian expatriate sportspeople in Lithuania
Ukrainian expatriate sportspeople in Russia
Hungarian expatriate sportspeople in Russia
Ferencvárosi TC footballers
FC Jokerit players
ESMTK footballers
FC Bihor Oradea players
FC Gomel players
FC Sheriff Tiraspol players
FC Vorskla Poltava players
FC Mariupol players
FK Vėtra players
FC Karpaty Lviv players
FC Spartak Vladikavkaz players
FC Sevastopol players
FC Hoverla Uzhhorod players
FC Metalist Kharkiv players
FC Balkany Zorya players
Ukrainian football managers
Ukrainian expatriate football managers
Hungarian football managers
Hungarian expatriate football managers
Expatriate football managers in Russia
FC Spartak Moscow managers
Diósgyőri VTK managers
Russian Premier League managers
FC Nosta Novotroitsk players